The Women's 4 × 100 metre medley relay competition of the 2014 European Aquatics Championships was held on 24 August.

Records
Prior to the competition, the existing world, European and championship records were as follows.

Results

Heats
The heats were held at 10:09.

Final
The final was held at 16:55.

References

Women's 4 x 100 metre medley relay